Jan Filip (born 14 June 1973) is a Czech handball coach.

References

External links

1973 births
Living people
Sportspeople from Prague
Czech handball coaches
Czech male handball players
Expatriate handball players
Czech expatriate sportspeople in Germany
Czech expatriate sportspeople in Switzerland
Handball-Bundesliga players
Rhein-Neckar Löwen players
HSG Nordhorn-Lingen players
Handball coaches of international teams